Alfred Hämmerle (26 July 1892 – 2 April 1959) was an Austrian sports shooter. He competed in the 50 m rifle event at the 1936 Summer Olympics.

References

1892 births
1959 deaths
Austrian male sport shooters
Olympic shooters of Austria
Shooters at the 1936 Summer Olympics
Place of birth missing